Jand Passenger is a passenger train operated daily by Pakistan Railways between Jand and Attock.

Route 
Jand Junction–Attock City Junction via Kotri–Attock Railway Line

Station stops

Equipment 
The train has economy accommodations.

References 

Named passenger trains of Pakistan
Passenger trains in Pakistan